Dongsheng Township is a township in extreme northwestern Jilin province, China, and it is under the administration of Taonan City. , it has 11 villages under its administration.

See also 
 List of township-level divisions of Jilin

References 

Township-level divisions of Jilin